The Slightest Shift is the second album by Canadian jazz pianist Kris Davis, which was recorded in 2005 and released on the Spanish Fresh Sound New Talent label.

Reception
The All About Jazz review by Troy Collins states, "An intriguing mix of influences, Davis' singular pianism is never derivative. Subconsciously revealing her classical training, touches of Ligeti and Bartok hover in the margins of her phrasing."

In a review for JazzTimes Forrest Dylan Bryant says, "Digging through eight of the pianist’s turbulent, open-structured pieces in a crisp 40 minutes, they slide readily into collective groans, finger-snapping Monk-ish walks and tumbled heaps of crossed melodic lines."

Track listing
All compositions by Kris Davis
 "Bloodwine" – 7:14
 "And Then I Said..." – 3:50
 "Once" – 4:00
 "35¢" – 3:10
 "Morning Stretches" – 3:58
 "Jack's Song" – 4:28
 "Twice Escaped" – 5:01
 "The Slightest Shift" – 8:15

Personnel
Kris Davis – piano
Tony Malaby – tenor sax
Eivind Opsvik – bass
Jeff Davis – drums

References

2006 albums
Kris Davis albums
Fresh Sound albums